Salem Lakes, formerly the town of Salem and the village of Silver Lake, is a village in Kenosha County, Wisconsin, United States. The village was created by a municipal merger on February 14, 2017. The population was 14,601 at the 2020 census. The communities of Benet Lake, Camp Lake, Cross Lake, Fox River, Lake Shangrila, Liberty Corners, Salem, Salem Oaks, Silver Lake, Trevor, Voltz Lake, and Wilmot are wholly or partially located in the village.

History
In June 1837, John Dodge became the first settler in Salem proper. Shortly thereafter, General Bullen and David Bullen settled on the east bank of the Fox River and surveyed and platted a village, hoping to make Salem a main head of Fox River navigation. A bridge spanning the river was called "Bullen's Bridge".

On February 14, 2017, Salem Lakes became a village, which included the village of Silver Lake, as well as the communities of Trevor, Wilmot, and Camp Lake.

Geography
According to the United States Census Bureau, the town in 2010 had a total area of 32.4 square miles (83.9 km2), of which 29.7 square miles (76.9 km2) were land and 2.7 square miles (7.0 km2, or 8.34%) were water.

Demographics

As of the census of 2000, there were 9,871 people, 3,529 households, and 2,653 families residing in the town. (Please note that this census occurred before the merger of the village of Silver Lake, and does not include the data from that area.) The racial makeup of the town was 97.33% White, 0.53% African American, 0.32% Native American, 0.30% Asian, 0.02% Pacific Islander, 0.80% from other races, and 0.70% from two or more races. Hispanic or Latino of any race were 2.51% of the population.

There were 3,529 households, out of which 40.2% had children under the age of 18 living with them, 61.9% were married couples living together, 9.0% had a female householder with no husband present, and 24.8% were non-families. 18.8% of all households were made up of individuals, and 5.2% had someone living alone who was 65 years of age or older. The average household size was 2.79 and the average family size was 3.21.

In the town, the population was spread out, with 29.6% under the age of 18, 6.8% from 18 to 24, 34.6% from 25 to 44, 20.8% from 45 to 64, and 8.2% who were 65 years of age or older. The median age was 35 years. For every 100 females, there were 102.9 males. For every 100 females age 18 and over, there were 99.8 males.

The median income for a household in the town was $54,392, and the median income for a family was $60,032. Males had a median income of $41,458 versus $28,438 for females. The per capita income for the town was $22,814. About 5.2% of families and 6.8% of the population were below the poverty line, including 7.7% of those under age 18 and 4.0% of those age 65 or over.

Education
Paddock Lake and Salem are served by Westosha Central High School (located in Paddock Lake) and Wilmot High School in Wilmot, and Salem Consolidated Grade School and Trevor-Wilmot Elementary in Trevor.

Salem Lakes, Randall, Twin Lakes, and Paddock Lake are served by the Community Library.

Notable people
Alex Davison Bailey, mechanical engineer
Walker M. Curtiss, farmer and legislator
Daniel A. Mahoney, lawyer and legislator
Francis Paddock, physician and legislator
George M. Robinson, pioneer and legislator
Matt G. Siebert, legislator

References

External links
Village of Salem Lakes official website

Villages in Kenosha County, Wisconsin
Villages in Wisconsin